Zhob railway station, formerly Sandeman Fort railway station, is located in Zhob, Balochistan, Pakistan.

See also
 List of railway stations in Pakistan
 Pakistan Railways

References

Railway stations in Zhob District
Railway stations on Zhob Valley Railway Line